Each "article" in this category is a collection of entries about several stamp issuers, presented in alphabetical order. The entries are formulated on the micro model and so provide summary information about all known issuers.

See the :Category:Compendium of postage stamp issuers page for details of the project.

Packhoi 
Refer 	Pakhoi (Indochinese Post Office)

Pahang 
Dates 	1889 –
Capital 	Kuantan
Currency 	100 cents = 1 dollar

Main Article Needed 

See also 	Malaysia

Pakhoi (Indochinese Post Office) 
Dates 	1903 – 1922
Currency 	100 centimes = 1 franc

Refer 	China (Indochinese Post Offices)

Pakistan 
Dates 	1947 –
Capital 	Islamabad
Currency 	(1947) 12 pies = 1 anna; 16 annas = 1 rupee
		(1961) 100 paisa = 1 rupee

Main Article Needed

Palau 
Dates 	1983 –
Capital 	Koror
Currency 	100 cents = 1 dollar

Main Article  Postage stamps and postal history of Palau

Palestine (British Mandate) 
Dates 	1918 – 1948
Capital 	Jerusalem
Currency 	(1918) 1000 millièmes = 100 piastre = 1 pound
		(1927) 1000 mils = 1 pound (in parity to Pound Sterling)

Main Article  Postal history of Palestine

Palestine (Egyptian Rule) 
Area: Gaza Strip, during 1948 briefly also Southern parts of the West Bank.

Dates 	1948 – 1967
Currency 	1000 milliemes = 100 piastres = 1 pound

Refer 	Egyptian Occupation Issues

See also 	Gaza (Egyptian Occupation)

Palestine (Jordanian Rule) 
Dates 	1948 – 1950
Currency 	1000 mils = 1 pound

Refer 	Jordan

Palestinian Authority 
An agreement was signed in Washington on 13 September 1993 between Israel and Yasser Arafat's PLO (Palestine Liberation Organisation) which recognised the right of Palestinian self-rule in the Gaza Strip and an enclave on the West Bank around Jericho.  It was confirmed by the Cairo Agreement of 4 May 1994.

The Palestinians began issuing stamps in 1994 with the inscription The Palestinian Authority.

Dates 	1994 –
Capital 	Jerusalem ( claimed ) / Ramallah ( de facto )
Currency 	(1994) mils
		(1995) 1000 fils = 1 Jordanian dinar

Main Article  Postage stamps and postal history of the Palestinian National Authority

Panama 
Dates 	1878 –
Capital 	Panama City
Currency 	(1878) 100 centavos = 1 peso
		(1906) 100 centesimos = 1 balboa

Main Article Needed

Panama Canal 
Refer 	Canal Zone

Papal States 
Dates 	1852 – 1870
Capital 	Rome
Currency 	(1852) 100 bajocchi = 1 scudo
		(1866) 100 centesimi = 1 lira

Refer 	Italian States

Papua 
Dates 	1906 – 1942
Capital 	Port Moresby
Currency 	12 pence = 1 shilling; 20 shillings = 1 pound

Refer 	Papua New Guinea

Papua New Guinea 
Dates 	1952 –
Capital 	Port Moresby
Currency 	(1952) 12 pence = 1 shilling; 20 shillings = 1 pound
		(1966) 100 cents = 1 dollar
		(1975) 100 toea = 1 kina

Main Article  Postage stamps and postal history of Papua New Guinea

Includes 	British New Guinea;
		New Guinea (Australian Administration);
		North West Pacific Islands;
		Papua

See also 	German New Guinea

Paraguay 
Dates 	1870 –
Capital 	Asunción
Currency 	(1870) 8 reales = 1 peso
		(1878) 100 centavos = 1 peso
		(1944) 100 centimos = 1 guarani

Main Article Needed

Parma 
Dates 	1852 – 1860
Currency 	100 centesimi = 1 lira

Refer 	Italian States

Patiala 
Dates 	1884 – 1947
Currency 	12 pies = 1 anna; 16 annas = 1 rupee

Refer 	Patiala in Indian Convention states

Patmos (Patmo) 
Italian colony in the Dodecanese which used the general EGEO issues and had its own stamps inscribed
PATMO, the Italian name of the island.

Dates 	1912 – 1932
Capital 	Patmos
Currency  	100 centesimi = 1 lira

Refer 	Aegean Islands (Dodecanese)

Paxos 
Refer 	Corfu & Paxos (Italian Occupation)

Pechino (Italian Post Office) 
Dates 	1917 – 1922
Currency 	Chinese and Italian both used

Refer 	Italian Post Offices Abroad

Peking (Foreign Post Offices) 
Refer 	French Post Offices Abroad;
		French Post Offices Abroad;
		Italian Post Offices Abroad;
		Russian Post Offices Abroad

Penang 
Dates 	1948 –
Capital 	George Town
Currency 	100 cents = 1 dollar

Main Article Needed 

See also 	Malaysia

Penrhyn Island 
Dates 	1973 –
Capital 	
Currency 	100 cents = 1 dollar

Main Article Needed 

Includes 	Penrhyn Island (New Zealand Administration)

Penrhyn Island (New Zealand Administration) 
Stamps of Cook Islands were used 1932–73.

Dates 	1902 – 1932
Capital 	
Currency 	12 pence = 1 shilling; 20 shillings = 1 pound

Refer 	Penrhyn Island

Perak 
Dates 	1878 –
Capital 	Ipoh
Currency 	100 cents = 1 dollar

Main Article Needed 

See also 	Malaysia

Perlis 
Dates 	1948 –
Capital 	Kangar
Currency 	100 cents = 1 dollar

Main Article Needed 

See also 	Malaysia

Persekutuan Tanah Melayu 
Refer 	Malayan Federation

Persia 
Dates 	1868 – 1935
Capital 	Tehran
Currency 	(1868) 20 shahis = 1 kran; 10 krans = 1 toman
		(1881) 100 centimes = 1 franc
		(1885) 20 chahis = 1 kran; 10 krans = 1 toman
		(1932) 100 dinars = 1 rial; 20 rials = 1 pahlavi

Refer 	Iran

Peru 
Dates 	1858 –
Capital 	Lima
Currency 	(1857) 8 reales = 1 peso
		(1858) 100 centavos = 10 dineros = 5 pesetas = 1 peso
		(1874) 100 centavos = 1 sol

Main Article Needed

Peter I Island 
Refer 	Norwegian Dependency

Philippines 
Dates 	1946 –
Capital 	Manila (note: Quezon City was the capital 1948–1976)
Currency 	(1946) 100 centavos = 1 peso
		(1962) 100 sentimos = 1 peso

Main Article Needed 

See also 	Philippines (US Administration);
		Spanish Philippines

Philippines (Japanese Occupation) 
Dates 	1942 – 1945
Currency 	100 centavos = 1 peso

Refer 	Japanese Occupation Issues

Philippines (US Administration) 
Dates 	1899 – 1945
Capital 	Manila
Currency 	(1899) 100 cents = 1 dollar
		(1906) 100 centavos = 1 peso

Refer 	US Post Abroad

Piedmont 
Piedmont is a region of NW Italy, bounded by Lombardy, France and Switzerland.  Formerly part of the historic Duchy of Savoy, it was annexed by the French Republic in 1792.  By the Treaty of Vienna 1815, it combined with the island of Sardinia to form a state officially known as the Kingdom of Sardinia.  However,
Turin was the capital and Piedmont, one of the most dynamic nations of 19th century Europe, is the name
generally used by historians.  The island of Sardinia was very much the junior partner.  Piedmont's
most prominent figure was Count Camillo Cavour (1810–61), the statesman who inspired and forged the
unification of Italy under Piedmont's leadership.

Stamps were issued in Turin on 1 January 1851 but do not show the country's name.  The first stamps of
unified Italy, issued in 1862, were also printed in Turin.

In the catalogues, Gibbons list the Piedmont/Sardinia stamps under Sardinia.  This is strictly correct but,
in view of the historical prominence of Piedmont, this work follows the accepted practice of most historians.
The relative insignificance of the island of Sardinia is perhaps best illustrated by the fact that Cavour,
although a noted traveller, never actually visited it!

Dates 	1851 – 1862
Capital 	Turin
Currency 	100 centesimi = 1 lira

Refer 	Italian States

See also 	Sardinia

Pietersburg 
Dates 	1901 only
Currency 	12 pence = 1 shilling; 20 shillings = 1 pound

Refer 	Transvaal

Pirate Coast 
Refer 	Trucial States

Piscopi 
Refer 	Telos

Pitcairn Islands 
Dates 	1940 –
Capital 	Adamstown
Currency 	(1940) 12 pence = 1 shilling; 20 shillings = 1 pound
		(1968) 100 cents = 1 dollar

Main Article Needed

Plebiscite Issues 
Main Article Needed 

Includes 	Allenstein;
		Carinthia;
		East Silesia;
		Marienwerder;
		Slesvig, 1920, issued by Commission Interalliée Slesvig;
		Upper Silesia

References

Bibliography
 Stanley Gibbons Ltd, Europe and Colonies 1970, Stanley Gibbons Ltd, 1969
 Stanley Gibbons Ltd, various catalogues
 Stuart Rossiter & John Flower, The Stamp Atlas, W H Smith, 1989
 XLCR Stamp Finder and Collector's Dictionary, Thomas Cliffe Ltd, c.1960

External links
 AskPhil – Glossary of Stamp Collecting Terms
 Encyclopaedia of Postal History

Packhoi